This list of 2000 motorsport champions is a list of national or international auto racing series with a Championship decided by the points or positions earned by a driver from multiple races.

Open wheel racing

Sports car

Touring car

Rallying

Stock car racing

Motorcycle

See also
 List of motorsport championships
 Auto racing

Champions,2000
 
2000